The Newar language of Nepal has the fourth oldest literature tradition among the Sino-Tibetan languages (after Chinese, Tibetan and Burmese).

The earliest known document in Newar is called "The Palmleaf from Uku Bahal" which dates from 1114 during the Thakuri period. The earliest dated stone inscription in Nepal Bhasa is dated Nepal Sambat 293 (1173 AD). From the 14th century onwards, an overwhelming number of stone inscriptions in the Kathmandu Valley, where they are an ubiquitous element at heritage sites, are in Nepal Bhasa.

The first books appeared in the 14th century.

 Haramekhalā (Devanāgarī: हरमेखला, a medical manual written in 1374
 Nāradsmṛti (नारदस्मृति) a law book written in 1380
 Amarkośa (अमरकोश), a Sanskrit-Newari dictionary written in 1381
 Gopālarāja Vaṃśāvalī (गोपालराज वंशावली), a history of Nepal written in 1389

The first story book is Tantrākhyāna (1518), and the first one-act play is Ekadaśī Brata (1633) written by King Siddhi Narasingha Malla.

Nepal Bhasa literature can be broadly divided into four periods.

 Classical Period (1505–1847)
 Dark Period (1847–1909)
 Renaissance Period (1909–1941)
 Modern Period (1941 onwards)

Classical period 
This was a golden age of cultural development and art and architecture in Nepal Mandala besides being a prolific period for Nepal Bhasa literature. The literary genres prevalent during this era consist of chronicles, epics, stories, scientific manuals mainly dealing with astrology and medicine, didactic poems and drama.

The kings and queens of the Malla dynasty were keen lyricists and playwrights. Dance dramas written at the time continue to be performed during annual festivals. King Mahindra Malla (reigned 1560–1574) is regarded as the first Newari poet. Other notable poets among the Malla kings include Siddhi Narsingh Malla (1619-1669), Pratap Malla, Ranjit Malla and Jaya Prakash Malla. Siddhi Narasingha Malla was the first Nepal Bhasa playwright. He wrote a one-act play entitled Ekādaśīvbrata in 1633 based on a Hindu story. His most famous work is Katti Pyakhan (1641) which is shown annually at Patan Durbar Square.

The queens Riddhi Laxmi (1680–1687), considered to be Nepal's first woman poet, Jaya Laxmi and Bhuvan Laxmi were also prominent songwriters. Among the public, Jagat Keshari (1678) of Banepa in the east of the Kathmandu Valley is celebrated for a hymn dedicated to Goddess Chandeswari.

In the later part of the Classical Period, Rajendra Bikram among the Shah kings is famed for writing Mahasatwa Pakhyan (1831), a play based on a Buddhist story. Pundit Sundarananda (circa 1793–1833) is known for his epics while Amritananda, besides composing poetry, wrote a grammar of Nepal Bhasa (1831).

Dark Period

After the Gorkha conquest of Nepal in 1768 and the advent of the Shah dynasty, the Nepali language, formerly known as Khaskura or Gorkhali, began edging out Newari.

Overt suppression was started by the Rana dynasty (1846–1951). In 1906, official documents written in Newari were declared illegal. The use of the language for business and literary purposes was forbidden. Books were confiscated and writers were jailed. As a result, not only literary creations but also writing for general purposes almost ceased; and the distance between the spoken and the written language began to widen.

A small number of hymns and religious stories were produced during this period. Notable writers of the era were Swami Abhayananda (younger brother of famed prime minister Bhimsen Thapa), Hari Bhakta Mathema, Man Bahadur Joshi and Bir Bahadur Malla.

Renaissance Period

During this period, a new generation of writers emerged who asserted themselves by producing literary works defying government restrictions. The renaissance aimed to restore the Newar language's lost glory and stimulate creative literature. The activities of this period laid the foundation for the future course of the language. The Nepal Bhasa movement dates from this period.

The renaissance also marked the advent of private printing presses and the end of handwritten books. In 1909, Nisthananda Bajracharya published the first printed book in Newari, Ek Bishanti Prajnaparamita, a Buddhist text. Another major change was the adoption of Devanagari script to write the language instead of Nepal alphabets because of the availability of Devanagari printing type. In 1913, Siddhidas Mahaju composed Siddhi Ramayana, a Newar version of the Hindu epic.

Jagat Sundar Malla worked to promote education. In 1925, Dharmaditya Dharmacharya published Buddha Dharma wa Nepal Bhasa, the first ever magazine in Newari, from Kolkata, India. Authors also worked to standardize the grammar and spelling, and new literary styles and genres were embraced. A grammar of the language, the first in modern times, was published in 1928.

The most important figures of this era were: 
 Nisthananda Bajracharya
 Siddhidas Mahaju
 Jagat Sundar Malla
 Yogbir Singh Kansakar 
 Shukraraj Shastri
 Prasiddha Batajoo
 Dharmaditya Dharmacharya

These writers spearheaded the revival of the language. Among the leaders of the renaissance, Bajracharya, Mahaju, Malla and Kansakar are honored as the Four Pillars of Nepal Bhasa.

Modern period

The 1940s marked the beginning of the modern period in Newari literature. During this period, new genres like short stories, poems, essays, novels and plays also emerged.

The jail years
The years 1941–1945 are known as the jail years for the large number of authors who were imprisoned for their literary or political activities. They were a productive period and resulted in an outpouring of works.

Chittadhar Hridaya, Siddhicharan Shrestha and Phatte Bahadur Singh were among the prominent writers of the period who were jailed for their writings. While in prison, Hridaya produced his greatest work Sugata Saurabha, an epic poem on the life of the Buddha. Shrestha wrote a collection of poems entitled Seeswan ("Wax Flower", published in 1948) among other works.

Singh (1902-1983) was sentenced to life imprisonment for editing and publishing an anthology of poems by various poets entitled Nepali Bihar. He had the book printed in Bettiah, India in 1939 and shipped to Nepal. After half of the print run had been sold, the rest of the copies were confiscated; and the contributors along with Singh were put in prison. Singh is best known as the founder of Nepal Bhasa Patrika, the first daily newspaper in Nepal Bhasa which began publication in Kathmandu in 1955. He was the editor and publisher.

Poets like Kedar Man Vyathit and Dharma Ratna Yami, who had been jailed on political charges, began writing in Newari too during their time in prison.

Revival of Theravada

Theravada Buddhist monks were especially influential in developing Nepal Bhasa literature. The resurgence of Newari coincided with the revival of Theravada Buddhism in Nepal, which the rulers disliked equally. From 1930, when the first yellow-robed monks appeared on the streets of Kathmandu since the 14th century, the number of their followers rapidly swelled, and books began to be published to educate them.

Braving official harassment, the monks produced a steady stream of books on Buddhism from India and greatly enriched the corpus of religious literature. Among the prominent authors of this period were Bauddha Rishi Mahapragya, Amritananda Mahasthavir, Dhammalok Mahasthavir, Pragyananda Mahasthavir and Aniruddha Mahathera.

In 1944, the Ranas exiled eight monks for refusing to stop teaching Buddhism and writing in Newari. They went to Sarnath, India and formed an organization named Dharmodaya Sabha. In 1947, the association launched a monthly magazine titled Dharmodaya from Kalimpong. Besides providing an opportunity for the growing number of writers, it had a major effect on standardizing the language. In 1946, the monks were allowed to return, and religious writing in Newari was permitted to be published after being censored.

Post-democracy
The overthrow of the Ranas in 1951 and move towards democracy brought a freer environment to writers. The 1950s saw a surge in literary activity and the appearance of new authors.

Baikuntha Prasad Lacoul belongs to the end of the renaissance and the beginning of the modern period. He is credited with introducing Western romanticism in Newari poetry.

Moti Laxmi Upasika (1909–1997) was the first poetess and short story writer in the modern period.

Satya Mohan Joshi (born 1920) is a poet, historian and cultural expert. The epic Jaya Prakash (published in 1955) about the last Malla king of Kathmandu, and Aranikoya Swet Chaitya (published in 1984) about the Nepalese artist Araniko who went to China in the 13th century, are two of his many notable works.

Ramapati Raj Sharma (born 1931) is a poet whose works draw inspiration from nature.

Madan Mohan Mishra (1931–2013) is known for his epic poetry and satire. His Gajiguluya Mhagasay Pashupatinath (गजिगुलुया म्हगसय् पशुपतिनाथ, "Pashupatinath in the Dreams of a Marijuana Smoker"), published in 1975, is one of his most loved works.

R. R. N. "Syasya" (1932–2002) was the pen name of Rebati Ramanananda Shrestha Vaidya. Syasya belongs to the young generation of writers that emerged in the 1950s. His early works include Malakha ("Dragon", a collection of poems, published in 1955), Kapan ("Rainbow", short stories, 1956) and Uphoswan ("Blue Lotus", story, 1956).

Narayan Devi (born 1935) is a poet whose poetry deals with women's empowerment and social discrimination.

Durga Lal Shrestha (born 1937) is a prolific, versatile and popular poet and songwriter. His works range from a collection of children's poems and songs entitled Chiniyamha Kisicha ("Sugar Elephant") to romantic and progressive compositions that have earned him the epithet of People's Poet.

Girija Prasad Joshi (1939–1987) was a poet whose works encompass romantic to progressive poetry.

Panchayat era

In 1960, parliament was abolished and the Panchayat system was established. Under the system'e one-language policy, Nepal Bhasa suffered another period of suppression. In 1965, the language was banned from being broadcast over Radio Nepal. The removal of Newari from Nepal's only radio station sparked a protest movement which became known as the Movement of 1965 ("Bais Salya Andolan").

As part of the protests, weekly literary meets were held at street squares and public courtyards for more than a year. Inspired by the literary activity, a host of new and young writers emerged. Poets Buddha Sayami, Nati Bajra Bajracharya, Shree Krishna Anu and Janak Newa and novelist Ratna Bahadur Sayami are some of the figures brought up by the protests. They introduced fresh literary styles and extended the bounds of Nepal Bhasa literature. The 1965 Movement was thus a very productive period.

Birat Nepal Bhasa Sahitya Sammelan Guthi (Grand Newari Literary Conference Trust), formed in 1962 in Bhaktapur, and Nepal Bhasa Manka Khala, founded in 1979 in Kathmandu, are some of the prominent organizations that emerged during this period to promote literature and struggle for language rights.

Today
Newari literature has a niche readership. Poetry, short stories, essays, novels, travelogues, biographies and religious discourses are the popular genres. A number of literary magazines are published. Translations of Nepal Bhasa literature in English and Nepali appear frequently. Literary organizations hold regular public recitals. Shashikala Manandhar is the first female novelist writing in the Bhasa language.

Outside Nepal Mandala

Poets based outside Nepal Mandala have also promoted Newari. Among them, Ganesh Lal Shrestha of Hetauda composed songs and gave music recitals during festivals in the 1940s and 1950s. In Pokhara, the first Grand Nepal Bhasa Literary Conference was held from 17–18 December 1975.

Literary genres
Dramas are traditionally performed on open "dabu" (platform) built at temple squares and major intersections. Most of the traditional dramas are related to deities and demons. Masked characters are central to such dramas. Music forms an important part of drama. Most of them are narrated with the help of songs sung at intervals. The theme of most dramas is to create social well-being with morals illustrating the rise, turbulence and fall of evil. There are fixed dates in the Nepal Sambat (Nepal Era) calendar for performance of specific plays. Most dramas are performed by specific Guthis.
Poetry writing constituted a pompous part of medieval Malla aristocracy. Many of the kings were well renowned poets. Epic poetry is very popular. Sitala Maju, which describes the expulsion of children from Kathmandu in the early 19th century, Ji Waya La Lachhi Maduni, about a luckless Tibet trader, and Silu, about an ill-fated pilgrimage to Gosaikunda, are among the well-known ballads. Siddhidas Mahaju and Chittadhar Hridaya are two great poets of the modern period.
Stories ranging from the origin of the Kathmandu Valley to its temples and important monuments have been passed down verbally in Newari. Very few of them were in written form initially. However, with an increase in literacy rate and an awareness amongst the people, those stories have been penned down. Stories on other topics have also taken root.
Novel writing has increased with the progressive increase in literacy after the modernization of Nepal. Restriction of the knowledge of alphabets to a certain caste of society during the medieval era reduced the viability of leisure reading among the masses.
History literature in Newari dates from the Malla era. Stone inscriptions were placed in important places to commemorate important events. Mention of family lines of the person instilling the inscription is also found in many cases.
Philosophy is one of the subjects of Siddhidas Mahaju's writings who has produced a number of works related to the norms of society.
Legal literature formulated during the reign of Jayastithi Malla formulated a major part of the norm of Newar society.

References

 
Newar language
Cultural history of Nepal
Nepalese literature by language